Kästner is a lunar impact crater that is located near the eastern limb of the Moon, to the southwest of the Mare Smythii. Just to the northwest of Kästner is the walled plain Gilbert. To the south is the prominent crater Ansgarius, and to the southwest lies La Pérouse.

This formation belongs to the category termed a walled plain. It has a worn, irregular outer wall that is overlaid by several small craters and there is a small break along the north-northeast. Along the northeastern rim is Kästner B, and to the southwest is the small Kästner E. A shallow, unnamed crater is attached to the southern rim. The interior floor is relatively level and featureless, with only a few small craterlets and minor ridges.

Satellite craters
By convention these features are identified on lunar maps by placing the letter on the side of the crater midpoint that is closest to Kästner.

The following craters have been renamed by the IAU.
 Kästner F — See Black.

Kästner B, R, and S are called Defoe, Shekhov, and Cellini on some older maps, but these names were not approved by the IAU.

References

 
 
 
 
 
 
 
 
 
 
 
 

Impact craters on the Moon